Lishui (Lishuinese: li⁶ syu³ ) is a prefecture-level city in the southwest of Zhejiang province, People's Republic of China. It borders Quzhou, Jinhua and Taizhou to the north, Wenzhou to the southeast, and the province of Fujian to the southwest. The name of the city literally means "Beautiful Waters."

History
Lishui has a very long history, for during the Liangzhu culture period 4000 years ago, there were tribes living in the area. In 589, a prefecture called Chuzhou was established by the Sui dynasty with Kuocang, Songyang, Linhai, Yongjia, Angu and Lechen counties under its jurisdiction. Three years later, the prefecture's name was changed to Kuozhou and then to Yongjia County in 607. The name was changed back to Kuozhou in 621 during the Tang dynasty, to Jinyun County in the first year of the Tianbao era (742) and back to Kuozhou in the first year of Qianyuan Era (758).

In 779, during the Tang dynasty, it was renamed Lishui County.  The name of the area was changed again in the year 1276 during the Yuan Dynasty to Chuzhou Lu and to Annan "Fu" (prefecture) in the 19th year of Zhizheng (1359). The name of the area was maintained as Chuzhou Fu until the Ming and Qing Dynasties when it was changed back to Lishui. In the year 1935, the area was given the official name: Lishui Administrative Supervision District. In 1949, the Lishui Special District was established but then abolished in 1952. Later, it was re-instated in 1963 and the area was renamed as Lishui City. By the year 1997, Longquan, Qingtian, Jinyun, Yunhe, Qingyuan, Suichang, Songyang and Jingning were under the jurisdiction of Lishui, Liandu District serving as the administrative headquarters.

Administration

The prefecture-level city of Lishui currently administers one district, one county-level city, six counties and one autonomous county.

These are further divided into 64 towns, 128 townships (including 6 She Minority Townships) and 5 subdistricts.

Geography and climate

Lishui is situated in the southwest of Zhejiang province, with its administrative area covering latitude 27° 25' to 28° 57' N and longitude 118° 41' to 120° 26' E. It borders the cities of Ningde and Nanping (Fujian province) to the southwest as well as Quzhou to the northwest, Jinhua to the north, Taizhou to the northeast, and Wenzhou to the southeast. The mountains of the area are part of the Wuyi Mountains. The Ou River flows through the city before emptying in the East China Sea.

Lishui has a monsoon-influenced humid subtropical climate (Köppen Cfa), with short, mild winters (with occasional frost), and long, very hot, humid summers. Autumn and early winter are the driest times of the year, while from March to June rain falls on more than half of the days. From midsummer on to autumn, typhoons occasionally strike the area.

Sports

The 19,000-capacity Lishui Stadium is located in Lishui. Part of the seats are covered with a roof. The stadium is used mostly for association football matches and also sometimes for athletics.

Transportation and telecommunications
Lishui enjoys a convenient telecommunication and transportation network. Lishui uses optical cables and SPCETSS (Stored Program Controlled Electronic Telephone Switching System) to provide the whole prefecture with communication services such as telephone, fax, telegram, internet, and mobile phones. Over  of paved roads and highways link every sub-county of the prefecture. These roads, together with the No.330 National Highway and Jinhua-Wenzhou Railway, form the public transportation system of the prefecture.

Government and politics
Under the guide of the basic line of the third Plenary Session of the eleventh Party Congress, the local government of Lishui has transformed its work priority to economic development. The government put forward a policy where forestry is the top priority, combining food and livestock husbandry, multi-management, comprehensive development and enhanced the agricultural development. In 1985, the local government proposed the guideline of:

 Emancipate the mind
 Take a bold reforming attitude
 Make Lishui more efficient
 Achieve Double Development Ahead of Schedule
 Promote the Development of Commodity Economy.

In 1991, the whole area set out for the great discussion of open-mind and concept innovation, to develop along the River, to run markets along road and develop industry in town. This has played an active role in the development of the agricultural industry, market construction and township industries. From 1994 to 1995, the area set out for further discussion of the open mind, by exploring the idea of the satisfaction of primary achievement, fixing the problem of poverty, trying to fix environmental issues, enhance the awareness of various crises, competitiveness, promotion, foreign development and pragmatism.

Economy

Timber, waterpower, mineral deposit and wilderness are four major natural resources of Lishui prefecture that rank first in Zhejiang province. 69% of the prefecture is covered with forest, which gives it the name "Foliage Ocean of Zhejiang". The prefecture boasts potential waterpower of about 2 gigawatts. So far, 57 mineral reserves are proved to scatter the prefecture and 460 mines are available for exploitation. Among its most important minerals, are gold, silver, lead, zinc, molybdenum, fluorite, pearlstone, pyrophyllite, dolianite, kaoline and mineral water, whose reserves claim an important place in Zhejiang, even in China. 
In the recent years, Lishui prefecture has seen a rapid development in industry. An industry structure that carries the features of mountainous area is burgeoning. Its main industries are wood and bamboo production, ore smelting, textile, clothes making, construction materials, pharmaceutical chemistry, electronic machinery and food processing.

Over 180 brand name and high quality products of the prefecture sell well both within China and in about 100 foreign countries. Among them, wooden toys, mini electronic machinery, overedger, eider down products, gold pens and quality soaps are the most welcome. The three traditional handicrafts of the prefecture, Longquan celadon, Longquan swords, and Qingtian carved stones, enjoy high popularity both at home and abroad.

A comprehensive agricultural development program is beginning to take effect. The prefecture is now a commercial base for edible fungi, Nasdaq listed Farmmi is the main exporter, as well as dried and fresh fruit, bamboo and bamboo shoots, tea, commercial forest, oil tea, sericulture, herb medicine, vegetable and nuts. Products like shiitake mushrooms, tree fungus, Huiming tea, white pond lily, day lily, sun-cured tobacco, and orange and oil tea are produced in large quantities and are well known throughout Zhejiang.

Energy production
Lishui is abundant in energy resources. With 600 hydroelectric power stations in use and 500 more still under construction, the prefecture has a total power capacity of 547 megawatts and an annual output of 1.5 billion kilowatt-hours (5.4 PJ). Every city of the prefecture has been incorporated in the east China power network, which provides a 220,000-volt vertical and a 110,000-volt inter-regional power transmission system, with a stable substation capacity of 550,000 KVA.

Tradition food
In Lishui, there are specialties such as Anren fish head, bamboo shoots and eggs, high mountain snails, braised fish, rolls and Jinyun biscuits, all of which are authentic Lishui local dishes; in 2007, the Lishui Tourism Bureau and the Lishui Catering Industry Association compiled the book "Dizhou Cuisine", which concentrates Lishui's famous dishes, including more than 50 varieties of traditional dishes such as Hibiscus lotus seeds, bamboo shoots and eggs, fried double dong, Jinyun knocking meat soup, Anren fish head and high mountain snails, more than 30 varieties of innovative dishes such as braised fish, fried cooking Zhi Zhi, chopped fish head, and more than 30 varieties of flavourful snacks such as Lishui rolls, Qingming fruit, yellow fruit and Jinyun biscuits.

Tourism
The city of Lishui has stepped up its tourism recovery and integration into the Yangtze River Delta region with a number of agreements inked in Shanghai. Under an agreement signed by the Lishui City Administration of Culture, Radio and Television, Tourism and Sports and operators of Shanghai City Tour Card on August 24, 2020, a Shanghai-Lishui annual tourism pass will be launched, enabling holders to visit major attractions in both cities at discounted prices. It takes about two hours and 20 minutes to reach Lishui from Shanghai via high-speed rail. The city has two dozen 4A- and 5A-level attractions, 2,725 villages and more than 4,300 minsu (Chinese-style B&Bs).

Lishui is well known in China for its long history and beautiful landscapes. Yan Yu Lou (misty rain tower) was built during the Northern Song Dynasty (AD 960–1127). Many famous ancient poets praised the tower's beauty. Other recommendable scenic spots are Fengyangshan-Baishanzu National Natural Resort, Xiandu National Park, and Shishi Temple. Shishi Temple is a wooden structure built during the Song and Yuan Dynasties (AD 960–1368). The most characteristic local dishes are Jade Mutton Roll, Shan Fen Ball, Anren Fish with beancurd, and Xian Cai Hot Pot.

See also 
 Lishui University
 List of people from Lishui
 She Ethnicity

References

Further reading 
 
 
 
 
 
 

For more thorough information about Lishui, there are two "Lishui Green Valley Culture" series published by Zhejiang Ancient Books Publishing House, containing six volumes each about different topics of cultural, literary, or historical significance. The 2008 series contains the following works on Lishui:
 
 
 
 
 
 

The 2010 series contains the following works on Lishui:

External links 
 Government website of Lishui
 Government website of Lishui
 Lishui News
 A China Daily writeup on Lishui
 The Lishui Page from China Pages

 
Cities in Zhejiang
589 establishments
6th-century establishments in China
Prefecture-level divisions of Zhejiang